John Tannery Henley (August 10, 1921 – March 17, 2012) was a North Carolina politician and pharmacist from Hope Mills, North Carolina. He was born in Wadesboro, North Carolina. He served as mayor of Hope Mills, as a member of the North Carolina House of Representatives and of the North Carolina Senate, where he served as President Pro Tempore for the 1975–76 and 1977-78 General Assemblies. He died in 2012 in Fayetteville, North Carolina.

References
North Carolina Manual of 1975, p. 297
Obituary

1921 births
2012 deaths
People from Wadesboro, North Carolina
Democratic Party members of the North Carolina House of Representatives
Democratic Party North Carolina state senators
Mayors of places in North Carolina
American pharmacists
People from Hope Mills, North Carolina